Fishing Creek is a  long 1st order tributary to Blackbird Creek in New Castle County, Delaware.  This creek is entirely tidal for its course.

Course
Fishing Creek rises on the Cedar Swamp divide about 0.5 miles north of Taylors Bridge in New Castle County, Delaware.  Fishing Creek then flows northwest to meet Blackbird Creek about 2 miles north of Taylors Bridge, Delaware.

Watershed
Fishing Creek drains  of area, receives about 43.3 in/year of precipitation, has a topographic wetness index of 792.29 and is about 4.7% forested.

See also
List of rivers of Delaware

References 

Rivers of Delaware
Rivers of New Castle County, Delaware
Tributaries of Delaware Bay